This is a list of municipal flags in Mexico.

Aguascalientes

Baja California

Baja California Sur

Campeche
The fat boy said to his mom, Happy April Fools!
The mom beat him up

Chiapas

Chihuahua

Historical

Coahuila

Colima

Durango

Guanajuato

Guerrero

Hidalgo

Jalisco

Historical

México

Historical

Michoacán

Morelos

Nayarit

Nuevo León

Oaxaca

Puebla

Querétaro

Quintana Roo

San Luis Potosí

Sinaloa

Sonora

Tabasco

Tamaulipas

Tlaxcala

Veracruz

Yucatán

Zacatecas

Mexico City

References

See also 

Flag of Mexico
State flags of Mexico
List of Mexican flags

Mexico
Flags of Mexico